Werdenberg may refer to :

Places
Werdenberg, Switzerland, a town in the municipality of Grabs, St. Gallen, Switzerland
Werdenberg (Holy Roman Empire), a state of the Holy Roman Empire, c. 1230–1517
Werdenberg District, a former district
Werdenberg (Wahlkreis), a constituency
Werdenberg Castle, a castle in the town of Werdenberg

People
 (c. 1440 – c. 1474) (de)
Anna von Werdenberg (died 1554), grandmother of Gebhard Truchsess von Waldburg
 (c. 1480 – 1530), Knight of the Golden Fleece
George III of Werdenberg-Sargans, married to Katharina, daughter of Charles I, Margrave of Baden-Baden
 (? – c. 1271), also Count of Kraiburg and Marquartstein
 (c. 1350–1416), Bishop of Chur
Hartmann III, Count of Werdenberg-Sargans (died 1354), ruler of the County of Sargans in around 1337, see List of state leaders in 1337
Johann II of Werdenberg (c.1430–1486), Bishop of Augsburg
 (c. 1416 – 1465), married to the daughter of Eberhard III, Count of Württemberg

Fictional people
Princess Marie Thérèse von Werdenberg (The Marschallin), in Richard Strauss' opera Der Rosenkavalier